Toxopneustidae is a family of globular sea urchins in the class Echinoidea.

Characteristics
All Camarodonts have imperforate tubercles and compound ambulacral plates. In addition, the Toxopneustids are characterised by the peristome, or opening through the test, having a sharp margin with the buccal notches being prominent. The tubercles lack the crenulations or ring of cog-like structures that articulate with the spines in certain other families. The Aristotle's lantern, or jaw apparatus, has the keeled teeth and the epiphyses united above the foramen magnum, the V-shaped gap between the hemipyramids that support the lantern's tooth.

Genera
Goniopneustes Duncan, 1889
Gymnechinus Mortensen, 1903b
Lytechinus A. Agassiz, 1863
Nudechinus H.L. Clark, 1912
Oligophyma Pomel, 1869
Pseudoboletia Troschel, 1869
Schizechinus Pomel, 1869
Scoliechinus Arnold & H.L. Clark, 1927
Sphaerechinus Desor, 1856
Toxopneustes L. Agassiz, 1841b
Tripneustes L. Agassiz, 1841b

See also
Lytechinus variegatus
Lytechinus williamsi
Toxopneustes pileolus
Tripneustes gratilla
Tripneustes ventricosus

References